Liam Munroe (born 28 November 1933) is an Irish former professional footballer. He made his one and only appearance for the Republic of Ireland national football team on 28 October 1953, in a 4-0 win against Luxembourg in a World Cup qualifying game at Dalymount Park.

A former schoolboy international he began his club career with Shamrock Rovers in 1952 where he was part of a great Milltown team, popularly known as Coad's Colts. In his second season, he won the League of Ireland. In November 1953 RCF Paris sought Munroe's signature.

He signed for Ards F.C. in January 1956. The following 1956/57 season was his best, as he scored 37 goals in 38 appearances. His last season was the unforgettable 1957/58 one when Ards won their one and only Irish League Championship. He only played in 15 games for Ards that season before he was transferred to Bristol City in the English Football League Division Two in December 1957 for £1,500. Munroe only played one league game for Bristol, however, before returning to Northern Ireland with Distillery.

In October 1959 he signed for Dundalk F.C. and scored a record 19 league goals that season. He returned to Ards in the 1962/63 season for a brief 12 game spell. Munroe emigrated from his native Dublin to Toronto in 1990.

Honours
 League of Ireland:
  Shamrock Rovers – 1953–54
 League of Ireland Shield:
  Shamrock Rovers – 1954–55, 1955–56
 Leinster Senior Cup:
  Shamrock Rovers – 1953, 1955
 Irish Premier League:
 Ards – 1957/58
 County Antrim Shield:
 Ards – 1956

References

External links

1933 births
Republic of Ireland association footballers
Ireland (FAI) international footballers
Shamrock Rovers F.C. players
Dundalk F.C. players
League of Ireland players
Ards F.C. players
Lisburn Distillery F.C. players
Bristol City F.C. players
Scunthorpe United F.C. players
English Football League players
NIFL Premiership players
Living people
League of Ireland XI players
Association football forwards